Cole John Bassett (born July 28, 2001) is an American professional soccer player who plays as a midfielder for Major League Soccer club Colorado Rapids and the United States national team.

Club career
Born in Littleton, Colorado, Bassett joined the Colorado Rapids academy in 2017 from the Colorado Rush. A year later, on August 10, 2018, Bassett signed his first professional contract with the Rapids as a homegrown player. He proceeded to make his competitive debut for the club on September 8 against the Portland Timbers. He came on as a 71st minute substitute for Kortne Ford as Colorado lost 2–0. He scored his first senior goal against FC Dallas on the final game of the 2018 season. In his second season, Bassett scored two goals and two assists, and was ranked No. 20 on the MLS 22 under 22 rankings of the best young players in the league. Bassett made the rankings again in 2020, this time coming in at No. 7.

Bassett enjoyed a breakout 2020 campaign. Bassett scored his first goal of 2020 on Aug 29 in a 1–1 draw against Sporting Kansas City. Bassett earned MLS Team of the Week honors in Weeks 10, 12 and 13. Bassett ended the season as Colorado's leader with five goals and five assists. Additionally, Bassett was tied for the second-highest big chance conversion rate in MLS at 80 percent. Bassett scored .92 non-penalty goals + assists per 90 minutes, which was fourth-best in MLS, and covered 11.33 km per 90 minutes, which was fifth-most in the league. At the club's annual end-of-year awards gala, Bassett was named the Players' Player of the Year, Young Player of the Year and Team MVP by Centennial 38, the Rapids' supporters group. He was also presented the Golden Boot alongside Jonathan Lewis.

Bassett scored his first goal of the 2021 MLS Season on May 8 in a 3–2 win over Minnesota United and earned MLS Team of the Week Honors (Week 4) for his performance. On May 15, 2021, Bassett scored his 10th MLS career goal in a 3–1 victory over Houston Dynamo and, in doing so, he moved into first on Colorado's all-time Homegrown goalscoring list, surpassing former teammate Dillon Serna.

In January 2022, Bassett joined Dutch club Feyenoord on a season-and-a-half long loan with an option to buy for the club.

After making an appearance in the opening game of the 2022–23 Feyenoord season, Bassett was recalled from the loan and sent on a season-long loan to another Dutch club, Fortuna Sittard on August 13, 2022. On November 18, 2022, Bassett was recalled from his loan and returned to Colorado.

International career 
After a very successful 2020 Major League Campaign, Bassett received his first senior call-up to the United States men's national soccer team on November 30, 2020, ahead of a match scheduled for December 9 against El Salvador alongside teammates Sam Vines and Kellyn Acosta. He scored his first goal on December 18, 2021, against Bosnia and Herzegovina in a 1–0 win.

Bassett was again called into U.S. Men’s National Team's domestic-based January Training Camp in Phoenix, Arizona in 2022.

Career statistics

Club

International

International goals
Scores and results list United States' goal tally first.

Personal 
Bassett has a younger brother, Sam Bassett, who played soccer for the Colorado Rapids Academy and is committed to the University of Denver.

References

External links
 Colorado profile

2001 births
Soccer players from Colorado
Sportspeople from Littleton, Colorado
Living people
American soccer players
United States men's international soccer players
Association football midfielders
Colorado Rapids U-23 players
Colorado Rapids players
Colorado Springs Switchbacks FC players
Feyenoord players
Fortuna Sittard players
Homegrown Players (MLS)
Major League Soccer players
USL Championship players
Eredivisie players
American expatriate soccer players
Expatriate footballers in the Netherlands
American expatriate sportspeople in the Netherlands